Richard Shapiro may refer to:

 Richard Shapiro (screenwriter), American television screenwriter and producer with his wife Esther Shapiro
 Richard B. Shapiro, former chairman of the California Horse Racing Board

See also
 Rick Shapiro, American comedian and actor